Vojvodina is a province in Republic of Serbia and one of the most ethnically diverse regions in Europe, home to 25 different ethnicities.

Serbs
 
Serbs – There were 1,289,635 Serbs in Vojvodina or 66.76% of the population in the province. Serbs make up an absolute majority in most of the municipalities and large cities of Vojvodina, except in Subotica (second largest city), which has a mixed population with no absolute majority of any nation (but the Serbian language is spoken by plurality in Subotica). Large cities with a Serb ethnic majority are: Sremska Mitrovica (87.37%), Ruma (86.58%), Inđija (84.87%), Pančevo (79%), Novi Sad (78.79%), Bačka Palanka (78.59%), Kikinda (75.43%), Zrenjanin (74.24%),  Vršac (72.26%),  Sombor (63.29%), and Apatin (62.79%). Other municipalities with a Serb ethnic majority are: Pećinci (91.1%), Opovo (86.14%), Titel (86.51%), Žabalj (84.69%), Odžaci (83.16%), Stara Pazova (82.86%),  Irig (78.53%), Sremski Karlovci (77.94%), Šid (77.93%), Kovin (74.58%), Bela Crkva (73.21%), Sečanj (69.3%), Novi Bečej (67.42%), Beočin (69.66%), Temerin (67.56%), Nova Crnja (67.39%), Srbobran (65.63%), Žitište (61.96%), Alibunar (60.71%), Kula (58.55%), Novi Kneževac (57.19%), Vrbas (55.23%) and Plandište (51.76%). Serbs are also the largest ethnic group in Bač (46.86%). Serbian is one of six official languages of Vojvodina, and is spoken by 76.63% of people in Vojvodina.

Hungarians
 
Hungarians – There are 251,136 Hungarians in Vojvodina or 13% of the population and they are the second largest ethnic group in the region. Hungarians mostly live in northern Vojvodina (northern Bačka and northern Banat). They constitute an absolute majority in 5 municipalities: Kanjiža (85.13%), Senta (79.09%), Ada (75.04%), Bačka Topola (57.94%), and Mali Iđoš (53.91%). There are also 3 ethnically mixed municipalities, with no absolute majority held by any nation, in which ethnic Hungarians constitute the largest percent of the population: Čoka (49.66%), Bečej (46.34%) and Subotica (35.65%). About two-thirds of all Hungarians in Vojvodina live in these 8 municipalities. Hungarian is one of the six official languages of Vojvodina, and is spoken by 14% of inhabitants.

Slovaks
 
Slovaks – There are 50,321 Slovaks in Vojvodina or 2.6% of population. Slovaks are the third largest ethnic group in Vojvodina. They constitute an absolute majority in Bački Petrovac municipality (66.41%) and they also constitute the largest percent of the population in Kovačica municipality (41.07%). Slovak is one of six official languages of Vojvodina, spoken by 2.71% of the population of the province.

Croats

Croats – There are 47,033 Croats in Vojvodina or 2.78% of the population. The largest concentration of Croats could be found in the municipalities of Apatin (10.42%) and Subotica (10%). Most of Bunjevci and almost all of Šokci of Vojvodina declare themselves as Croats. Also one part of Yugoslavs of Vojvodina were declaring themselves as Croats before 1971. Croatian is one of six official languages of Vojvodina, spoken by 1.04% of the population.

Roma people

Roma (Gypsy) – There are 42,391 Roma in Vojvodina or 2.19% of the population. The largest concentration of Roma could be found in the municipalities of Nova Crnja (6.83%), Beočin (6.51%), and Novi Kneževac (5.04%). The Roma language is not official in Vojvodina, but there are TV programs and other publications in the Roma language.

Romanians

The Romanians - There are 25,410 Romanians in Vojvodina or 1.32% of the population. The largest concentration of Romanians could be found in the municipalities of Alibunar (24.1%) and Vršac (10.4%). They settled in Banat during great migrations of Balkanic peoples caused by Ottoman conquest (1552–1716), and also during Austrian administration (1716–1776). According to theories of origin of Romanians, they emanated from Romanization of the Roman Province of Dacia, i.e. they descending from the antique populations of Dacians (Getae, Thracians) and Roman legionnaires and colonists. It is assumed that this Romance population survived great migrations of early Middle Ages somewhere in Transylvanian mountains, from where it later spread to Wallachia, Moldova, Banat and other areas. Romanian is one of six official languages of Vojvodina, spoken by 1.08% of inhabitants.

Montenegrins

Montenegrins - there are 22,141 declared ethnic Montenegrins in Vojvodina or 1.15% of the population. This does not includine those who identify as Montenegrin on a regional or national basis yet proclaim a Serbian identity. They were settled in Vojvodina during the 20th century, mostly shortly after World War II. The largest concentration of Montenegrins could be found in the municipalities of Vrbas (17.47%), Mali Iđoš (16.26%), and Kula (10.06%). Settlements in Vojvodina with Montenegrin majority are: Lovćenac (Mali Iđoš municipality), Kruščić (Kula municipality), and Savino Selo (Vrbas municipality).

Bunjevci

Bunjevci – Bunjevci are small ethnic group whose members mostly live in northern Vojvodina. There are 16,469 Bunjevci in Vojvodina. The largest concentration of Bunjevci could be found in the municipalities of Subotica (9.57%) and Sombor (2.4%). Members of Bunjevci community are divided according to declaration of nationality and many also declare themselves as Croats or Yugoslavs. This nationality division also divide some Bunjevac families and there are many cases in which one sibling has declared as Bunjevac, while the other one has declared as Croat. They speak (or have spoken) a specific Ikavian-Shtokavian dialect of Serbo-Croatian language. In census, they declare their language as Bunjevac or Serbian.

Rusyns

Rusyns – There are 13,928 Rusyns in Vojvodina and constitute 0.72% of the population. The largest concentration of Rusyns could be found in the municipalities of Kula (11.16%), Vrbas (8.21%), Žabalj (5.11%), and Šid (3.38%). Rusyn language is one of six official languages of Vojvodina and is spoken by 0.57% of the population. The Rusyn language is spoken mostly in Vojvodina and it is classified as western Slavic, thought it shares many similarities with Slovak. There is also a Rusyn language in Ukraine, but it is a different language classified as eastern Slavic.

Yugoslavs

Yugoslavs – There are 12,176 Yugoslavs in Vojvodina or 0.63% of the population. They mostly speak Serbian.

Macedonians

Macedonians- There are 10,392 Macedonians in Vojvodina. They settled in Vojvodina during the 20th century, mostly after World War II. The largest concentration of Macedonians could be found in the municipalities of Plandište (9.19%) and Pančevo (3.69%). They mostly speak Macedonian among themselves.

Ukrainians

Ukrainians – There are 4,202 Ukrainians in Vojvodina or 0.54% of the population. The largest concentration of Ukrainians could be found in the municipalities of Kula (2.99%) and Vrbas (1.99%). They mostly speak Ukrainian.

Ethnic Muslims

Ethnic Muslims – There are 3,360 declared Muslims (by ethnicity) in Vojvodina. They mostly speak the Serbian language. The largest concentration of ethnic Muslims could be found in the municipality of Bač (1.18%). The number of Muslims in the sense of followers of Islam is significantly higher.

Germans

Germans – There are 3,272 Germans or Danube Swabians in Vojvodina. They are part of a group that came in a couple of waves, mostly in the 18th century. The older ones mostly speak a form of Swabian German, with all of the children now fluent in Serbian, and often knowing High German (for economic reasons). The German population of Vojvodina was more numerous in the past (about 350,000 before World War II). More than 250,000 left during the withdrawal of German forces. As a consequence of the World War II events in Yugoslavia, the Yugoslav Communist government took a reprisals on ethnic citizens of German origin in Yugoslavia (including Vojvodina): they had their citizenship revoked and their belongings and houses were nationalized and taken from them. Between 1944 and 1946, a prison camp system was established for Yugoslav citizens of German origin, usually in settlements where they lived. After prison camps were abolished, ethnic Germans of Yugoslavia regained their rights and citizenship and most of them emigrated to Germany or Austria in the following years because of economic reasons. Before this war, the largest concentrations of Germans were in the municipalities of Odžaci (68.9%), Vrbas (61.1%), and Apatin (60.3%).

Albanians

Albanians – There were 2,251 Albanians in Vojvodina or 0.12% of the population.

Slovenes

Slovenes – There are 2,005 Slovenes in Vojvodina.

Czechs

Czechs – There are 1,648 Czechs in Vojvodina. They mostly speak Czech. The largest concentration of Czechs could be found in the municipality of Bela Crkva (3.99%). The only settlement in Vojvodina with Czech majority is Češko Selo in the Bela Crkva municipality.

Bulgarians

Bulgarians (mostly Banat Bulgarians) – There are 1,489 Bulgarians in Vojvodina.

Gorani

Gorani – There are 1,179 Gorani in Vojvodina.

Russians

Russians – There are 1,173 Russians in Vojvodina.

Jews

Jews – There were 206 ethnic Jews in Novi Sad city according to the 2002 census. The Jewish population of Vojvodina was quite large in the past (about 19,000 before World War II), but most of these Jews were killed or deported during the Axis occupation in World War II. The language of Vojvodina Jews was Yiddish, German or Hungarian, with many families bilingual (or even trilingual).

Historical preview

Recent demographic trends among largest ethnic groups in Vojvodina:

See also
 Demographic history of Vojvodina
 Serbs in Vojvodina
 Hungarians in Serbia
 Slovaks in Serbia
 Montenegrins of Serbia
 Romanians in Serbia
 Roma people of Serbia
 Banat Bulgarians
 Banat Swabians
 Danube Swabians

References 

 
Ethnic groups in Serbia